Quinlan is a rural city in the southern part of Hunt County, Texas, United States, within the Dallas–Fort Worth metropolitan area. As of the 2010 census, it had a population of 1,394.

History
The city of Quinlan began about 1892 as a stop on the Texas Midland Railroad, which was owned by famed bond investor Hetty Green, called by the contemporary press "The Witch of Wall Street". The railroad was operated by her son, Edward H.R. Green. Texas Midland became a subsidiary of the Houston & Texas Central Railroad, and the city which built up around a depot constructed here between the towns of Roberts and Greenville was named Quinlan in honor of George A. Quinlan, the general manager of the Houston & Texas Central railroad.

The post office opened in Quinlan in 1894, and by 1896, the city was incorporated. Harry Ford served as first mayor. Quinlan soon became the center of a large agricultural area, providing a railroad shipping point for growers of cotton and other crops. By the early 20th century, the town boasted three cotton gins, numerous businesses and fraternal organizations, banks, schools, churches, and homes.

Oil exploration and production overtook cotton farming as the area's economic base in the 1930s and 1940s, and the construction of Lake Tawakoni in the 1950s brought another economic boost to the community.

Some of the earliest settlers were John M. Cook and R. K. Epperson, who moved their businesses from Roberts. The settlement received a post office in 1894, and by 1900, its population had reached 362. This growth, no doubt induced by the presence of the railroad, continued through the first quarter of the 20th century. In 1904, 463 persons lived in Quinlan. The number rose to 537 by 1910 and 600 by 1914, when Quinlan had 20 businesses, including a bank and a weekly newspaper. In 1925, this "retail trade center for southern Hunt, northern Kaufman and Van Zandt Counties" had an elementary school, a high school, and 35 businesses, and managed a cotton harvest of some 5,000 bales. In 1933, Quinlan had 512 residents and 30 businesses; in 1952, the population of 599 supported 25 businesses; in 1964, the community had 621 persons and 22 businesses. After the mid-1960s, Quinlan grew considerably, largely due to its proximity to Lake Tawakoni. Quinlan had a population of 900 in 1976 and 1,002 in 1988, when it had 51 businesses. In 1990, its population was 1,360.

Geography 
Quinlan is in southern Hunt County. Texas State Highway 34 passes through the eastern side of the city, leading north  to Greenville, the county seat, and southwest the same distance to Terrell. Highway 276 passes through Quinlan as its Main Street, leading east across Lake Tawakoni  to Emory and west  to Rockwall.

Climate

Demographics

2020 census

As of the 2020 United States census, 1,414 people, 675 households, and 447 families were residing in the city.

2000 census
As of the census of 2000, 1,370 people, 558 households, and 364 families resided in the city. Population density was 1,098.0 people per square mile (423.2/km2). The 617 housing units had an average density of 494.5/sq mi (190.6/km2). The racial makeup of the city was 95.04% White, 0.66% African American, 0.58% Native American, 0.29% Asian, 2.34% from other races, and 1.09% from two or more races. Hispanics or Latinos of any race were 5.18% of the population.

Of the 558 households, 32.6% had children under 18 living with them, 45.5% were married couples living together, 15.8% had a female householder with no husband present, and 34.6% were not families. About 30.6% of all households were made up of individuals, and 15.6% had someone living alone who was 65 or older. The average household size was 2.46, and the average family size was 3.07.

In the city, the age distribution was 27.2% under 18, 9.3% from 18 to 24, 25.9% from 25 to 44, 21.7% from 45 to 64, and 15.8% who were 65 or older. The median age was 36 years. For every 100 females, there were 84.6 males. For every 100 females 18 and over, there were 80.3 males.

The city's median household income is $78,472, and the median family income was $66,635. Males had a median income of $54,688 versus $41,190 for females. The per capita income for the city was $36,122. About 8.3% of families and 12.4% of the population were below the poverty line, including 14.9% of those under 18 and 11.7% of those 65 or over.

Economy

Quinlan has a full-sized Walmart Supercenter and a full-sized Brookshires grocery store, along with other shops and stores, including Fix and Feed, Giddy Up and Go Coffee Shop, Lotus and Vine, and Southern Rhea’s Boutique. The city also has a number of fast-food chains and other restaurants, such ase Ain’t Just Pie Too, Whataburger, Dairy Queen, McDonalds, Sonic, Jalapeños, Burger King, and Taco Bell.

Education
The city is served by Quinlan Independent School District.

Infrastructure

Health care
Hunt Regional Medical Center operates a family-practice physician's office in Quinlan and a full-service medical emergency center. Several dental offices are in Quinlan.

Transportation

  Texas State Highway 34 is a north-south route that goes through the center of Quinlan. It connects with Terrell to the south and Greenville to the north.
  Texas State Highway 276 is an east-west route that is known locally as Quinlan Parkway. It connects with Rockwall to the west and Emory to the east.
  Texas State Highway Loop 264 runs from downtown Quinlan connecting SH 276 and SH 34.
  Farm-to-market Road 751 heads south towards Wills Point.
  Farm-to-market Road 2101 is a few miles outside of Quinlan at Boles Home. It heads north towards L3Harris and Majors Airport in Greenville.
 Rockin' M Airport is a municipal airport a few miles outside of Quinlan near Boles Home on FM 2101, and Majors Airport is roughly 20 minutes away in nearby Greenville.

Public transit is provided by The Connection, which serves Quinlan and all of Hunt County. The service operates Monday through Friday from 7 am to 7 pm. Reservations have to be made one day in advance. The charge is $2 ($4 round trip) if the passenger is traveling to a place within the same community or city, and $3 ($6 round trip) if the passenger is traveling from one city or community to another within Hunt County. The Connection will take Hunt County residents to Dallas as a round trip only. Passengers are charged $34, and a minimum of three passengers is also required.

Notable people
 Uel Eubanks, early 20th-century baseball pitcher

References

Dallas–Fort Worth metroplex
Cities in Hunt County, Texas
Cities in Texas
Populated places established in 1882